Tick Tock Lullaby is a 2007 British indie comedy-drama film written and directed by Lisa Gornick. It stars Gornick and Raquel Cassidy and Sarah Patterson.

Cast
 Raquel Cassidy as Maya
 Lisa Gornick as Sasha
 Sarah Patterson as Gillian
 Joanna Bending as Fiona
 Sam Spruell as Steve
 Jake Canuso as Laurence
 Matthew Parish as Fred
 David Lazenby as Hick
 William Bowry as Todd
 Joseph Lumsden
 Aviva Gornick
 Rupert Jones
 Melissa Docker
 Mikhail Karikis
 Uriel Orlow

References

External links

2007 films
2007 comedy-drama films
Lesbian-related films
2000s English-language films
British comedy-drama films
British LGBT-related films
Films shot in England
LGBT-related comedy-drama films
2007 comedy films
2007 drama films
2007 LGBT-related films
2000s British films